For the Summer Olympics, there are four venues that have been or will be used for Softball.

References

Softball